Chund Bridge (locally known as Chund Pull) is a bridge over the Chenab river. It is one of the oldest bridges in Pakistan. It is located near Chund Bharwana, Jhang District. Bridge has 750 meters length. Its name is after the nearest town Chund Bharwana. It is 14 km from Jhang.

References 

Jhang District
Bridges in Pakistan
Railway bridges in Pakistan
Bridges over the Chenab River